Tim Maddison is an Australian former professional rugby league footballer who played in the 1990s and 2000s.

Playing career
Maddison made his first grade debut for Newcastle in round 9 1993 against Cronulla.  In 1996, Maddison joined Eastern Suburbs and made 18 appearances for the club, one of which was the qualifying final against Manly, this was the club's first finals appearance in a number of years.

In 1997, Maddison joined super league side the Hunter Mariners and played in the club's only season.  After the liquidation of Hunter Mariners, Maddison joined Cronulla-Sutherland.  In 1999, Maddison made 15 appearances for Cronulla as they won the minor premiership but the player did not feature in the club's unsuccessful finals campaign.

In 2001, Maddison joined North Queensland playing two seasons with the club before returning to Newcastle in 2003.  During the 2002 NRL season, Maddison was suspended for ten matches after striking Sydney Roosters player Justin Holbrook.  Maddison's final game in first grade was a 48–18 loss against Canterbury.

External links
http://www.rugbyleagueproject.org/players/Tim_Maddison/summary.html

References

1973 births
Living people
Australian rugby league players
Cronulla-Sutherland Sharks players
Hunter Mariners players
Newcastle Knights players
North Queensland Cowboys players
Rugby league players from Newcastle, New South Wales
Sydney Roosters players